Yun Hota To Kya Hota (Urdu:) is a 2006 Hindi drama film. The film directed by Naseeruddin Shah stars Konkona Sen Sharma, Irrfan Khan, Ayesha Takia, Jimmy Sheirgill, Paresh Rawal, Boman Irani and Saroj Khan. The film explores four stories which eventually become intertwined with 9/11.

Plot 
The story revolves around a group of people who were not connected to each other in any way other than by ill-fate. These were people from different parts of India who had travelled to the US and now were boarding the ill-fated flights that crashed into the Twin Towers and Pentagon in New York on 9/11/2001. The story tells about the horror of the hijack and some of the incidents that occurred on board during those horrific minutes. Some of the characters in the film die in the attacks.

 Tilottama Das-Punj (Konkona Sen Sharma) is happily married to the man of her dreams, Hemant (Jimmy Sheirgill), whom she met online. However, their time together is cut short when Hemant is needed in the U.S. to attend to his job. Tilottama is left at home with her mother-in-law who makes sure that she does not keep in touch with him. Tilottama goes to extreme lengths to join him in USA. She survives at the end and reunites with her husband, thanks to a last minute goof up resulting in her missing the doomed flight and help given by a good samaritan.
 Salim Rajabali (Irrfan Khan) is the rich son of a powerful godmother. He is captivated by the much older Namrata (Suhasini Mulay). Unfortunately he gets involved in a murder and finds out that Namrata has been cheating on him. Before the situation gets out of hand, his mother (Saroj Khan) tells him to flee the country. He manages to reach New York and goes to one of the World Trade Center towers to meet one of his friends. Salim however, dies when the hijacked plane strikes at the very floor of the tower in which he is standing.
 Poor yet academically brilliant Rahul Bhide (Ankur Khanna) is over the moon when he receives an offer to study at a prestigious university abroad. But his excitement is short lived by the lack of funds and also due to his incapacitated father. Just when he gives up hope, he receives funding with the help of his friend Khushboo (Ayesha Takia) and looks forward to a bright future abroad. It is unfortunately not to be as he perishes in the plane when it strikes into one of the towers.
 Rajubhai Patel (Paresh Rawal) is an event organizer for prestigious and popular foreign shows. His ex-girlfriend Tara (Ratna Pathak Shah) mortgages her house to pays for her daughter Payal (Shahana Goswami) to be taken abroad along with him. He and Payal unfortunately, perish in the plane when it crashes into one of the towers.

Cast 
 Konkona Sen Sharma... Tilottama Das Punj
 Irrfan Khan ... Salim Rajabali	
 Ayesha Takia ... Khushboo	Modi
 Jimmy Sheirgill ... Hemant Punj
 Paresh Rawal ... Rajubhai Patel	
 Saroj Khan ... Amma, Salim's mother	
 Ratna Pathak Shah ... Tara Gandhi
 Ankur Khanna ... Rahul Bhide
 Boman Irani ... DCP Paul (Special Appearance)
 Suhasini Mulay ... Namrata
 Imaad Shah ... Joy
 Shahana Goswami ... Payal, Tara's daughter
 Sameer Sheikh   ... Nitin
 Meghna Malik .... Kalpa
 Ravi Baswani .... Papaji, Hemant's father
 Tinu Anand .... Dhiroobhai
 Rajat Kapoor .... U S Consulate Officer
 Karan Khanna ....Javed Rajabali
 Trishla Patel ....Natasha
 Ranvir Shorey ....Sports Bar Manager(Cameo)
 Makarand Deshpande .... Dom at cremation ground (in a friendly appearance)
 Karla Singh .... Carren Punj, Hemant's mother
 Utkarsh Majumdar .... Hirji
 Suhas Bhalekar .... Bhide, Rahul's father (in a friendly appearance)
 Guzby Walia .... Minal
 Ahmed Khan .... Minal's father
 Anupam Shyam .... Inspector Ranade
 Ruchi Pugalia .... Javed's wife
 Suhita Thate .... Zubeidaa
 Rakesh Trishal .... Kunal
 Lata Sharma .... Mrs Patel
 Surendra Rajan .... Butler Kaka

Music
"Ek Bar Jana America Janab" - Devraj Gadhavi(Nano Dero), Keerthi Sagathia, Javed Ali, Madhushree
"Ek Baar Jaana America" v2 - Keerti Sagathia, Joy Barua
"Yado Me Aksar Aate Rahe" - Shreya Ghoshal, Shaan
"Yu Hota To Kya Hota" - Sunidhi Chauhan, Kunal Ganjawala
"Pyaar Hai" - Sowmya Raoh

See also

List of cultural references to the September 11 attacks

References

External links 
Yun Hota Toh Kya Hota @ Bollywood Hungama
 
Review

Hyperlink films
2006 films
2000s Hindi-language films
Films based on the September 11 attacks
2006 directorial debut films
Indian aviation films
Films scored by Viju Shah